Psychrobacillus insolitus is a bacterium from the genus of Psychrobacillus which has been isolated from soil. Psychrobacillus insolitus can spoil food.

References

Bacillaceae
Bacteria described in 1967